is the 5th single by Japanese idol girl group French Kiss, a sub-unit of AKB48. It was released on July 18, 2012. It debuted in 2nd place on the weekly Oricon Singles Chart and was the 81st best-selling single in Japan in 2012, with 98,214 copies. It also reached 2nd place on the Billboard Japan Hot 100.

References 

2012 singles
2012 songs
Japanese-language songs
French Kiss (band) songs